Billy Costello (born William Donald Castiglioni; April 10, 1956 – June 29, 2011) was a professional boxer in the United States.

Early life
Costello was born in Kingston, New York, on April 10, 1956, to a Sicilian father and a mother of Native American, Italian and African American descent, as one of nine children. Costello was active in the Boy Scouts. He played third base on the Kingston High School baseball team and had originally hoped for a career as a professional baseball player.

Amateur career
Billy Costello won the 1978 135 pound New York Golden Gloves Open Championship. Costello stopped Raymond Johnson of the United Block Association in the second round to win the Championship. Costello began boxing in the Police Athletic League program in Kingston, and later trained at the Castle Hill Athletic Club in the Bronx, New York.

Professional career
During his career, he was managed by Mike Jones, who was also famous for managing Gerry Cooney and Wilford Scypion. Costello fought a lot of his early professional bouts around the Hudson Valley-NYC area, after a successful amateur career that culminated in a Golden Gloves award.  The Kew Gardens section of Queens, New York eventually became his home, at least while he was champion. But before winning a title, he put together an early undefeated streak, which included a 10-round decision over Willie Rodriguez on CBS television in November 1982. He and his management then became closely associated with the CBS network, which aired several of his fights.

The one and only title he held in his career, the WBC junior welterweight title, was won by knocking out Bruce Curry in the 10th round in January 1984 in front of a pro-Curry crowd in Beaumont, Texas. He would then make three defenses of the belt, all in Kingston, and all by 12-round unanimous decision. His first foe as champion was Ronnie Shields, with whom he traded first-round knockdowns before eventually securing the points win. Next was former WBC 140-lb. champion and veteran Saoul Mamby, who replaced Leroy Haley, another former possessor of Costello's belt, on five days notice. Costello defeated ex-champion Mamby unanimous decision.

His next fight was finally against Leroy Haley. The result was a unanimous win over 12 rounds for Costello. Next, a Denver, Colorado fighter named Lonnie 'Lightning' Smith defeated him, knocking down and cutting the defending champion en route to an eighth-round stoppage in New York City to claim the title in August 1985.

Billy kept coming back, next fighting three-time champion Alexis Argüello in February 1986. Arguello, behind on points, stopped Costello in Round 4 after knocking him down. Costello then took some time off from the ring, fighting on a sporadic 'here-and-there' basis until the early 1990s. In his last bout in 1999, he defeated former world champion Juan Laporte by ten round decision in a Pay Per View fight, avenging a 1986 loss to LaPorte by his brother Vinnie. All in all, Costello's professional career had lasted an astounding 20 years, from 1979–1999, and ended with a win over a former world champion. His respectable career had only two losses to world champions.

Costello is perhaps best remembered for his stoppage loss to Alexis Arguello.

Professional boxing record

Life After Boxing
In retirement, Costello worked as a home contractor, active in building and road construction. Costello also served as the volunteer director of the Kingston PAL Boxing Club in Kingston, New York. On evenings and weekends, Costello remained active in pro boxing as a professional boxing judge and referee in New York State at many sanctioned events. There is a Billy Costello Boxing Gym in Kingston, and Costello was involved in boxing shows in the area.

Book
Billy Costello's championship run was the subject of Thomas Hauser's "The Black Lights: Inside the World of Professional Boxing." One of the most widely heralded books ever written on boxing, Hauser appeared in the Costello training camp during last minute negotiations for a televised bout with substitute challenger Saoul Mamby, was given access to the contractual negotiations, and painted a literary portrait of the inside wheels of boxing as it affected Costello.

Personal life
Costello lived most of his life in Kingston, New York. He also lived in Kew Gardens (Queens), New York during much of his reign as champion. He then retired from boxing & moved to New Paltz, New York, a small village in Ulster County, New York near Costello's hometown of Kingston, New York. Costello eventually settled back in his hometown of Kingston, New York where he lived until his demise. He was married and divorced, and had a son and a daughter, who survive him. He was close with his younger brother Mario 'Vinnie' Costello, a noted professional boxer super featherweight boxer from 1981-1990 with a pro record of 20-2-2 but who never fought for a title, who trained with his brother under the late Victor Vallee, who also trained Gerry Cooney.

Death
According to his mother, Dolores, Costello died of lung cancer at a hospital in his native Kingston on June 29, 2011. He was 55. He was survived by: his parents, Dolores and Billy Costello Sr.; a daughter, Christine Costello, and a son, Brandon, from his marriage to his wife, Jane, which ended in divorce; four living brothers, Stephen, Mario 'Vinnie' Costello, Anthony, and Glenn; and two sisters, Vicky Costello and Tammy Moody.

See also
List of world light-welterweight boxing champions

References

External links

 

1956 births
2011 deaths
American male boxers
Boxers from New York (state)
Sportspeople from Kingston, New York
American people of Italian descent
African-American boxers
Native American boxers
Deaths from lung cancer
World Boxing Council champions
Light-welterweight boxers
World light-welterweight boxing champions